Shilshole Bay Marina is a 1400-slip saltwater marina in the Ballard neighborhood of Seattle, Washington, operated by the Port of Seattle. The marina is protected by a  breakwater, features a roughly  public promenade with view of the Olympic Mountains, and includes Leif Erikson Plaza, site of a  statue of the Viking Leif Erikson.

The marina was completed in 1958 and underwent a US$80 million modernization beginning in 2004, including a completely replaced marina building. There is 2,700 linear feet (820 linear metres) of guest moorage.

The marina accommodates both long-term and short-term moorage. Services include an independently operated fuel dock, an independently operated boatyard, a Small Boat & Sailing Center with three hoists and kayak launch, a limited amount of dry moorage, restrooms, showers, laundry, self-service sewer and bilge pump-out, and free garbage disposal, recycling, and oil and HAZMAT collection. Parking is free, and Comcast Cable TV and high-speed Internet connection are included in dock fees. The City of Seattle Department of Parks and Recreation operates a boat ramp at the north end of the marina, allowing boats to be loaded and unloaded from trailers.

History

Leif Erikson statue 

Seattle's strong Scandinavian-American community is historically centered in Ballard, the neighborhood where the Shilshole Bay Marina is located, and is particularly strong in the maritime trades. The bronze Leif Erikson statue, designed by University of Washington music professor August Werner (1893-1980), was unveiled June 17, 1962 (Norwegian Constitution Day). Since 1963, maritime charts have noted the statue as a navigational landmark.

Seattle's Scandinavian-American community had celebrated Leif Erikson Day annually on October 9 beginning in 1941. 
Trygve "Ted" Nakkerud (1903-1995) began advocating for a statue of Leif Erikson in 1956, and founded the Leif Erikson League (still extant 2022 as the Leif Erikson Society) April 29, 1957, with members from 17 different Scandinavian groups in Seattle to raise funds and obtain an appropriate site. The league was chaired by Thorbjorn Grønning (1888-1969). They raised US$40,000 to cast the statue, and began negotiations to have an appropriate place to put the statue. Early efforts would have placed the statue at Seattle Center (then the "Civic Center" and soon to be the site of the Century 21 Exposition, a World's Fair) or in a city park.

Originally the League planned to hold a competition for the designer of the statue, but Werner put himself forward and convinced the League to skip that and appoint him. This was not without rancor, including that architect and league member John Engan, who initially worked with Werner, declined to work with him after Werner ignored Engan's structural advice and an early model of the statue collapsed. Werner also feuded with the league over who should do the casting; he ultimately won that battle, and the bronze was cast by Franco Vianello and Spero Anargyros in Berkeley, California, rather than in New York or Oslo. The City expressed concern over the possibility of city parks becoming "overrun" with statues sponsored by cultural and civic clubs, and the Municipal Art Commission had doubts about the aesthetics of the statue, but once the Shilshole location was negotiated (on Port land rather than City land) the Arts Commission approved that plan unanimously. The Port Commmission was also unanimous in voting a go-ahead on February 27, 1962.

The statue was moved within the marina in 2007; the current pedestal dates from that year, as do the 14 "runestones" and the longboat-shaped plaza. The runic carvings on the stones are by Jay Haavik. Besides the names of people directly involved in the initial project, beginning in 2007 more than 2,300 additional names of Scandinavian immigrants have been inscribed either on the statue's base or on one of the "runestones". There are three later  copies of the statue, also in bronze, located elsewhere in the world: Trondheim, Norway (1997); Brattahlid, Greenland (2000); and L'Anse aux Meadows, Newfoundland (2013).

References

External links
 

Marinas in Washington (state)
Puget Sound
Water transport in Seattle